École Secondaire Robert A. McMath Secondary School is a high school located on Garry Street in the Steveston neighbourhood of Richmond, British Columbia.  Named in honour of Robert Alexander McMath (1915-1996).  McMath served with the Seaforth Highlanders of Canada during the Second World War.  In 1951, McMath was elected as a school trustee in the city of Richmond, and from 1957 until his retirement in 1993 he served on Richmond's Municipal Council.

The school opened in 1998 and serves grades 8 to 12. It is a bilingual school providing a French immersion program.  

The school is fed into by the nearby elementary schools of Lord Byng Elementary School, Westwind Elementary School, Manoah Steves Elementary School, John G. Diefenbaker Elementary School, Dixon Elementary School and Homma Elementary School as well as all French immersion students from 15 other elementary schools in western Richmond.

As of 2023, the current principal is Mr. J Johnstone and the vice principals are Ms. A Naidu and Mr. T Ngo. The school's sports teams are all called the McMath Wildcats. McMath uses the 2 semester system with PLT (Personal Learning Time)

Films
The 6th Day starring Arnold Schwarzenegger was filmed at this school.
The TV Show Supernatural has filmed multiple episodes in McMath Secondary.
The Diary of a Wimpy Kid 3 was filmed near McMath Secondary.
Kim Possible (2019 film) was filmed in McMath Secondary.

References

External links
Official school site

High schools in Richmond, British Columbia
Educational institutions established in 1999
1999 establishments in British Columbia